KMKF (101.5 FM) is a radio station licensed to Manhattan, Kansas, and serves the eastern portion of the Salina-Manhattan radio market.  The station is currently owned by Manhattan Broadcasting Company.

"K-Rock" airs a format of mainstream rock. Personalities include David G on the K-ROCK Morning Show, middays with Steve-OH, afternoons with Sloan and nights with Mitch Fortner. Sloan serves as the Program Director for the station.  K-Rock also airs "The House of Hair with Dee Snider" on Sunday evenings.

KMKF, along with sister station KMAN-AM, is the flagship station of the K-State Sports Network, airing Kansas State University Football and Men's Basketball games.  The station also airs the locally produced "Powercat Gameday" program, as well as the radio shows of both football head coach Bill Snyder and basketball coach Bruce Weber.

KMKF is part of Manhattan Broadcasting Company, which also owns and operates KMAN (News Talk/Sports), KXBZ (Hot Country), KACZ (Top 40), and KBLS (Adult Contemporary).  MBC also provides an ever-increasing digital presence, with video facilities in their recently expanded offices.

Corey Reeves began his radio career at MBC on-air with K-Rock (as "Cadillac" Corey Dean), working up to co-hosting the morning show until 2012.  He then became Operations Manager, getting promoted to General Manager to succeed Rich Wartell in November 2015.  Andrea Besthorn is the Sales Manager for the company.

Former Staff
 Jason Sellers
 Kylie Powers
 Jared O'Neal
 Glazier
 Shawn Rock
 Drewcifer
 "Scarface" Jeremy Weiland
 "Doc" Rock
 Jason Schlitz
 Chris Taylor
 Raubin Pierce
 Marty Meyers
 Jeff Wilson
 Shane Sellers
 Lucas Fox
 Scott Hoch
 Steve Anthony
 Andy Crowl
 Frank Sereno

References

External links
 

MKF
Mainstream rock radio stations in the United States
Radio stations established in 1991
1991 establishments in Kansas